Miss Marie Lloyd: Queen of The Music Hall is a British television drama directed by James Hawes and produced by Hat Trick Productions. It was first shown on BBC Four in 2007.

The film traces the turbulent and unconventional life of Edwardian music hall star Marie Lloyd, portrayed by Jessie Wallace. The drama formed part of BBC Four's Edwardians – The Birth of Now season.

Cast 
 Jessie Wallace as Marie Lloyd
 Richard Armitage as Percy Courtenay
 Matthew Marsh as Alec Hurley
 Tom Payne as Bernard Dillon
 Lee Williams as Freddie
 Shaun Parkes as 'The Showman'
 Angus Barnett as Mr Belafonte
 Amanda Root as Mrs Chant
 Annette Badland as Nelly Powers
 Sue Elliot-Nicholls as Bridey

Reception
In her article ahead of the broadcast, Sarah Dempster for The Guardian said that: "Wallace's performance is as bracing as a power walk down Lambeth High Street". The reviewer for The Scotsman commented that the script was "awful", with it making "a pig's ear of what was obviously an interesting life". The review concluded with a reference to Wallace's character in EastEnders, stating that Wallace: "was perfectly fine in the role, giving it as much of the old [Kat] Slater oomph as she could, but she'll have to find much better things than this if she wants to escape typecasting."

Awards
Lucinda Wright was nominated in the costume design category for the British Academy Television Craft Awards for 2008.

DVD 
This production is available on DVD, distributed by Acorn Media UK.

References

External links
 
 

BBC television dramas
2007 British television series debuts
2007 British television series endings
Television series by Hat Trick Productions